The Cutler-Orosi Joint Unified School District is a school district in California.

The towns of Cutler (pop. 6,999; elev. 358') and Orosi (pop. 11,181; elev. 373), separated by about 1 mile, are located in Tulare County, California. The Cutler-Orosi Unified School District has an average daily attendance of 3,784; Mount Whitney (elev. 14,505 ft, 4,421 m), the highest point in the Continental United States, falls within the school district's borders.

Schools
The Cutler-Orosi Unified School District has a variety of schools:

State Schools
 Cutler Elementary School
 Cutler-Orosi Community Day School 
 Cutler-Orosi Adult School
 Golden Valley Elementary School
 Palm Elementary School
 El Monte Jr. High
 Orosi High School

Alternative Schools
 Lovell High School
 Yettem Continuation High School
 Esperanza Independent Study
 Community Day School

External links

References 

School districts in Tulare County, California